Roberto Mañalich (born 4 March 1906, date of death unknown) was a Cuban fencer. He competed in the individual and team épée and individual sabre events at the 1948 Summer Olympics.

References

1906 births
Year of death missing
Cuban male fencers
Olympic fencers of Cuba
Fencers at the 1948 Summer Olympics
Sportspeople from Havana
Pan American Games medalists in fencing
Pan American Games silver medalists for Cuba
Pan American Games bronze medalists for Cuba
Fencers at the 1951 Pan American Games
Fencers at the 1959 Pan American Games
20th-century Cuban people